Martin Sinner was the defending singles champion but lost in the quarterfinals to Tim Henman.

Cédric Pioline won in the final 6–2, 7–6(9–7) against Kenneth Carlsen.

Seeds
A champion seed is indicated in bold text while text in italics indicates the round in which that seed was eliminated.

  Jan Siemerink (second round)
  Bohdan Ulihrach (first round)
  Cédric Pioline (champion)
  Filip Dewulf (quarterfinals)
  Mikael Tillström (quarterfinals)
  Guillaume Raoux (second round)
  Kenneth Carlsen (final)
  Marc-Kevin Goellner (second round)

Draw

External links
 1996 Copenhagen Open draw

1996 Copenhagen Open – 1
1996 ATP Tour